Gagetown is an unincorporated community in Queens County, New Brunswick, Canada. It held village status prior to 2023. It is on the west bank of the Saint John River and is the county's shire town.

History

Gagetown was originally named Grimross by the Acadians and Maliseet, who lived there prior to the Expulsion of the Acadians. The Raid on Grimross occurred during the St. John River Campaign (1758–59). During the Expulsion of the Acadians, many Acadians fled from various parts of the Maritimes to villages along the Saint John River. The St. John River Campaign occurred during the French and Indian War when Colonel Robert Monckton led a force of 1,150 British soldiers to destroy the Acadian settlements on the banks of the Saint John River until they reached the largest village of Ste Anne's Point (present day Fredericton, New Brunswick) in February 1759. There were 2000 Acadians on the Saint John River, many of whom were refugees trying to escape the Expulsion of the Acadians.

On November 4, 1758, Robert Monckton entered the nearly vacant village and New England Rangers under his command chased down and scalped Acadians. They burned 50 buildings, crops and killed the animals.

The name of the village is derived from British General Thomas Gage. Major General Thomas Gage was granted a large tract of land in central New Brunswick in appreciation of his service to the British Empire in the Seven Years' War; this land comprises modern day Gagetown.

During the 1800s and early 1900s, Gagetown was a historic Loyalist community that served as a stop for river boats. It is the birthplace of Sir Samuel Leonard Tilley, a Father of Confederation.

The nearby army training centre, CFB Gagetown, takes its name from the community, although its headquarters are in Oromocto. Despite sharing the name, Gagetown has no direct access to the base and its training area.

Every Summer since 2009 a local music & art collective known as FEELS GOOD and the North Hampton Brewing Company (which produces a local microbrew known as Picaroons) has produced and hosted a 3-day music festival known as Folly Fest. Folly Fest generally falls on the weekend closest to the split of June & July.

The Gagetown Ferry, formerly a free cable ferry, crossed the Saint John River to Lower Jemseg on the east bank, but in 2015 the Liberal Government cut the ferry for provincial budget reasons. In 2020, the Gagetown ferry service was restored but only for the summer tourist season.

On 1 January 2023, Gagetown amalgamated with the village of Cambridge-Narrows and all or part of five local service districts to form the new village of Arcadia. The community's name remains in official use.

Climate 
Gagetown has a humid continental climate (Köppen Dfb) with warm summers, cold winters and plenty of precipitation year-round. Snowfall is frequent in winter.

Demographics 

Notable people

 John Montgomery was born in Gagetown. He owned the tavern (Montgomery's Tavern in Toronto, Ontario) which served as a base for the rebels during the Upper Canada Rebellion. His parents were loyalists who fled from New York following the American revolution.
 Annie Babbitt Bulyea (1863-1934) was born in Gagetown. She was a Canadian temperance leader.

See also
List of lighthouses in New Brunswick
List of communities in New Brunswick

References

External links
 Village of Gagetown

Communities in Queens County, New Brunswick
Former villages in New Brunswick
Lighthouses in New Brunswick